As a result of the party failing to enter the government after a poor performance in the legislative election in the previous January, a leadership election for the Israeli Labor Party was held on 22 November 2013.

Candidates

Shelly Yachimovich, incumbent Leader of the Labor Party and incumbent Leader of the Opposition
Isaac Herzog, Member of the Knesset and former Minister of Welfare and Social Services

Results 
The only round of voting was held on November 22:

According to Ynetnews, turnout of voting Labor Party members was a relatively low 52.7%. Herzog won a majority of the votes cast and was thus elected leader of the party.

References

Israeli Labor Party leadership elections
2013 elections in Israel
Israeli Labor Party leadership election
November 2013 events in Asia